Welt (North Frisian: Wäilt) is a village in the district of Nordfriesland, Schleswig-Holstein, Germany. It is notable in that its name is identical to the German word meaning "world".

See also
Eiderstedt peninsula

References

External links
Official homepage 

Nordfriesland